The tribovoltaic effect is the effect of generating of tribo-current at a sliding semiconductors interface (PN junction) or sliding semiconductor and metal interface (Schottky junction), which is firstly proposed by Wang et al. in 2018. When a P-type semiconductor slides over a N-type semiconductor, the energy “quantum” also named as “bindington” will be released at the interface due to the formation of new chemical bonds. The released energy can excite electron-hole pairs at the interface, which are further separated and moved from one side to the other side under the built-in electric field at the semiconductor interface, generating a direct current in external circuit.

Nomenclature 
The generation of tribo-current at the sliding PN junction or Schottky junction is analogous to the generation of photo-current in the photovoltaic effect, so that it is named as “tribovoltaic effect” by Wang et al.

Experimental evidence 
The tribovoltaic effect was verified experimentally as both macro- and nano-scale. It was found that a direct current can be generated by sliding the N-type diamond coated tip over the P-type Si samples, and the direction of the tribo-current is depended on the direction of the built-in electric field at the PN and Schottky junctions.

Tribovoltaic effect at liquid-solid interface 
The tribovoltaic effect can not only occur at solid-solid interface, but also at aqueous solution and solid semiconductor interface, in which the aqueous solution is considered as a liquid semiconductor. When a water droplet slides over a semiconductor surface, the built-in electric field will exist at the interface due to the difference in the Fermi levels, and some water molecules will contact the fresh surface, forming chemical bonds and releasing energy, and the released energy “quantum”, also named as “bindington”. If the liquid starts to slide on the solid semiconductor surface, the bindington will be released and electron-hole pairs will be excited at the interface. Driven by the built-in electric field, the electron-hole pairs are separated and move from one side to the other side, generating a continuous direct current in external load. The tribovoltaic effect at liquid-solid interface was also verified experimentally by Wang et al.

Reference 

Surfaces